Bridgewater Township may refer to:
Bridgewater Township, Michigan
Bridgewater Township, Rice County, Minnesota
Bridgewater Township, New Jersey
Bridgewater Township, Williams County, Ohio
Bridgewater Township, Susquehanna County, Pennsylvania

Township name disambiguation pages